Nyssodrysternum diopticum is a species of beetle in the family Cerambycidae. It was described by Bates in 1864.

Habitat 
The Nyssodrysternum diopticum is native to South America and specimens have been taken from Bolivia and Ecuador.

References

Nyssodrysternum
Beetles described in 1864